The Swimming Pool is a 2012 Cuban art house film directed by Carlos M. Quintela and produced by Cuban-Canadian filmmaker Sebastian Barriuso. The film premiered at the 2012 Havana Film Festival, and later showed at the 2013 Berlin International Film Festival as part of the Panorama Special section.

Synopsis 
The film follows a swimming instructor and his four differently-abled students – Diana, whose leg has been amputated; Oscar, who refuses to speak; Dani, who has Down Syndrome; and Rodrigo, who has a mobility issues  – and the tense conflict that arises between them.

Cast 

 Raúl Capote
 Mónica Molinet
 Felipe García
 Carlos Javier Martínez
 Marcos Costa

Critical reception 
It was described as "contemplative and enigmatic" by Deborah Young of The Hollywood Reporter.

Jaie Laplante, Director of Programming of the Miami Film Festival gave the film a positive review:In Carlos Machado Quintela's debut feature film, which held its North American premiere at the 2013 Miami Dade College's Miami Film Festival, a minimalist aesthetic and extraordinary control of frame and composition question traditional patterns of cinematic syntax.

References

External links
 

2012 films
Cuban drama films
2010s Spanish-language films